Bernard Marchand (born 31 January 1912) was a Swiss sprinter. He competed in the men's 100 metres at the 1936 Summer Olympics.

References

External links
 

1912 births
Year of death missing
Athletes (track and field) at the 1936 Summer Olympics
Swiss male sprinters
Olympic athletes of Switzerland
Place of birth missing